This is a list of the main organ systems in the human body.

Circulatory system/cardiovascular system 

Circulates blood around the body via the heart, arteries and veins, delivering oxygen and nutrients to organs and cells and carrying their waste products away, as well as keeping the body's temperature in a safe range.

Digestive system/excretory system 

System to absorb nutrients and remove waste via the gastrointestinal tract, including the mouth, oesophagus, stomach and intestines.

Endocrine system 

Influences the function of the body using hormones.

Integumentary system/exocrine system 

System that comprises skin, hair, nails, and sweat and other exocrine glands.

Immune system/lymphatic system 

Defends the body against pathogens that may harm the body. The system contains a network of lymphatic vessels that carry a clear fluid called lymph.

Muscular system 

Enables the body to move using muscles.

Nervous system 

Collects and processes information from the senses via nerves and the brain and tells the muscles to contract to cause physical actions.

Renal system/urinary system 

The system where the kidneys filter blood to produce urine, and get rid of waste.

Reproductive system 

The reproductive organs required for the production of offspring.

Respiratory system 

Brings air into and out of the lungs to absorb oxygen and remove carbon dioxide.

Skeletal system 

Bones maintain the structure of the body and its organs.

See also
 List of distinct cell types in the adult human body
 List of organs of the human body
 Organ systems
Organ systems
Systems